Friction welding (FRW) is a solid-state welding process that generates heat through mechanical friction between workpieces in relative motion to one another, with the addition of a lateral force called "upset" to plastically displace and fuse the materials. Because no melting occurs, friction welding is not a fusion welding process, but a solid-state welding technique more like forge welding. Friction welding is used with metals and thermoplastics in a wide variety of aviation and automotive applications.

ISO norm of friction welding is EN ISO 15620:2019 there is information about basic terms and definitions and table of weldability of metals and alloys.

History

Some applications and patents connected with friction welding were dated back to the turn of the 20th century and rotary friction welding is the oldest of this methods. W. Richter patented the method of linear friction welding (LFW) process in 1924 in England and 1929 in Germany, however, the description of the process was vague and H.Klopstock patented the same process in the USSR 1924. But first description and experiments related to rotary friction welding took place in the Soviet Union in 1956, machinist named A. J. Chdikov has realized scientific studies and suggested the use of this welding method as a commercial process. The process was introduced to the USA in 1960. The American companies Caterpillar Tractor Company (Caterpillar - CAT), Rockwell International, and American Manufacturing Foundry all developed machines for this process. Patents were also issued throughout Europe and the former Soviet Union. The first studies of friction welding in England were carried out by the Welding Institute in 1961. The USA with Caterpillar Inc. and MTI developed an inertia process in 1962. Europe with KUKA AG and Thompson launches rotary friction welding for industrial applications in 1966, developed a direct-drive process and in 1974 builds rRS6 the double spindle machine for heavy truck axles. Another method was invented and experimentally proven at The Welding Institute (TWI) in the UK and patented in 1991 Friction stir welding (FSW) process a solid-state joining process that uses a non-consumable tool to join two facing workpieces without melting the workpiece material. In 2008 KUKA AG developed the friction welding machine SRS 1000 with a forged force of 1000 tons.

An improved modification of the standard friction welding is also Low Force Friction Welding, hybrid technology developed by EWI and Manufacturing Technology Inc. (MTI), "uses an external energy source to raise the interface temperature of the two parts being joined, thereby reducing the process forces required to make a solid-state weld compared to traditional friction welding". The process applies to both linear and rotary friction welding.

Today, the friction welding research materials comes from many places around the world, including Africa, South America, North America, Europe and Asia, and Australia.

Metal techniques

Rotary friction welding

Rotary friction welding (RFW) is one of the methods of friction welding. One welded element is rotated to the other and pressed down. The heating of the material is caused by friction work and created not separable weld.

Linear friction welding

Linear friction welding (LFW) is similar to spin welding, except that the moving chuck oscillates laterally instead of spinning.

Friction stir welding 

Friction stir welding (FSW) is a solid-state joining process that uses a non-consumable tool to join two facing workpieces without melting the workpiece material. Heat is generated by friction between the rotating tool and the workpiece material, which leads to a softened region near the FSW tool. While the tool is traversed along the joint line, it mechanically intermixes the two pieces of metal, and forges the hot and softened metal by the mechanical pressure, which is applied by the tool, much like joining clay, or dough.

Friction surfacing

Friction surfacing is a process derived from friction welding where a coating material is applied to a substrate. A rod composed of the coating material (called a mechtrode) is rotated under pressure, generating a plasticized layer in the rod at the interface with the substrate.

Thermoplastic technique

Linear vibration welding

In linear vibration welding the materials are placed in contact and put under pressure. An external vibration force is then applied to slip the pieces relative to each other, perpendicular to the pressure being applied.

Orbital friction welding
Orbital friction welding is similar to spin welding, but uses more complex machine to produce an orbital motion in which the moving part rotates in a small circle, much smaller than the size of the joint as a whole.

Method list connected to friction welding 

 Forge welding
 Friction stir welding (FSW)
 Friction stir spot welding (FSSW)
 Linear friction welding (LFW)
 Friction welding of pipeline girth welds (FRIEX)
 Friction hydro pillar overlap processing (FHPPOW)
 Friction hydro pillar processing (FHHP)
Linear vibration welding
Spin welding of polymers
 Low Force Friction Welding

Other information

Welds tests for Friction Welding and description of zones 

Quality requirements of welded joints depend on the form of application, e.g. in the space or fly industry weld errors are not allowed. There are many scientific articles describing the weld, weld quality tests assurance is performed, with measurements and numerical methods. Science tries to gets good quality welds.

For example, an ultra fine grain structure of alloy or metal which is obtained by techniques such as severe plastic deformation is desirable, and not changed by the high temperature, a large heat affected zone is unnecessary.

Moreover, in addition to changing the grain structure during metal joining cycles, by methods where high temperature affected zone was occur, are phase transformations structure. For example, in steel between austenite, ferrite, pearlite, bainite, cementite and martensite, see: Iron-carbon phase diagram. In order to avoid changes solid state welding may be desired and large heat affected zone is not needed if weakens the material properties.

Heat and mechanical affected zones in friction weld 

Individual thermomechanical zones can be described by citing an example article:

Anthony R.McAndrew, Paul A.Colegrove, Clement Bühr, Bertrand C.D., Flipo Achilleas Vairis, "A literature review of Ti-6Al-4V linear friction welding", 2018.

"Technically the WCZ and the TMAZ are both "thermo-mechanically affected zones" but due to the vastly different microstructures they possess they are often considered separately. The WCZ experiences significant dynamic recrystallisation (DRX), the TMAZ does not. The material in HAZ is not deformed mechanically but is affected by the heat. The region from one TMAZ/HAZ boundary to the other is often referred to as the "TMAZ thickness" or the plastically affected zone (PAZ). For the remainder of this article this region will be referred to as the PAZ."

Zones:

 WCZ– weld center zone,
 HAZ – heat affected zone,
 TMAZ – Thermo-Mechanically Affected Zone,
 BM – base material, parent material,
 Flash.

Similar terms exist in welding.

Seizure resistance 
Friction welding may unintentionally occur at sliding surfaces like bearings. This happens in particular if the lubricating oil film between sliding surfaces becomes thinner than the surface roughness, which may be due to low speed, low temperature, oil starvation, excessive clearance, low viscosity of the oil, high roughness of the surfaces, or a combination thereof.

The seizure resistance is the ability of a material to resist friction welding. It is a fundamental property of bearing surfaces and in general of sliding surfaces under load.

Curiosities 

 Frictional welding (μFSW) was also performed using a CNC machine. which does not mean that it is safe and recommended for the milling machine.
 Friction welding has also been shown to work on wood.

Terms and definitions, name shortcuts 
To quote ISO (the International Organization for Standardization) - ISO 15620:2019(en) Welding — Friction welding of metallic materials:

"axial force - force in axial direction between components to be welded,

burn-off length - loss of length during the friction phase,

burn-off rate - rate of shortening of the components during the friction welding process,

component - single item before welding,

component induced braking - reduction in rotational speed resulting from friction between the interfaces,

external braking - braking located externally reducing the rotational speed,

faying surface - surface of one component that is to be in contact with a surface of another component to form a joint,

forge force - force applied normal to the faying surfaces at the time when relative movement between the components is ceasing or has ceased,

forge burn-off length - amount by which the overall length of the components is reduced during the application of the forge force,

forge phase - interval time in the friction welding cycle between the start and finish of application of the forge force,

forge pressure - pressure (force per unit area) on the faying surfaces resulting from the axial forge force,

forge time - time for which the forge force is applied to the components,

friction force - force applied perpendicularly to the faying surfaces during the time that there is relative movement between the components,

friction phase - interval time in the friction welding cycle in which the heat necessary for making a weld is generated by relative motion and the friction forces between the components i.e. from contact of components to the start of deceleration,

friction pressure - pressure (force per unit area) on the faying surfaces resulting from the axial friction force,

friction time - time during which relative movement between the components takes place at rotational speed and under application of the friction forces,

interface - contact area developed between the faying surfaces after completion of the welding operation,

rotational speed - number of revolutions per minute of rotating component,

stick-out - distance a component sticks out from the fixture, or chuck in the direction of the mating component,

deceleration phase - interval in the friction welding cycle in which the relative motion of the components is decelerated to zero,

deceleration time - time required by the moving component to decelerate from friction speed to zero speed,

total length loss (upset) - loss of length that occurs as a result of friction welding, i.e. the sum of the burn-off length and the forge burn-off length,

total weld time - time elapsed between component contact and end of forging phase,

welding cycle - succession of operations carried out by the machine to make a weldment and return to the initial position, excluding component - handling operations,

weldment - two or more components joined by welding."

References

Plastic welding
Welding